Elene Kakhniashvili (born 6 June 2004) is a Georgian footballer who plays as a defender for the Georgia women's national team.

Career
Kakhniashvili has been capped for the Georgia national team, appearing for the team during the UEFA Women's Euro 2021 qualifying cycle.

References

2004 births
Living people
Women's footballers from Georgia (country)
Women's association football defenders
Georgia (country) women's international footballers